Plitvički Vrh is a dispersed settlement in the hills west of Gornja Radgona in northeastern Slovenia.

References

External links
Plitvički Vrh on Geopedia

Populated places in the Municipality of Gornja Radgona